Edward Joseph Kelly (February 26, 1890 – April 21, 1956) was an American prelate of the Roman Catholic Church.  He served as bishop of the Diocese of Boise in Idaho from 1927 until his death in 1956.

Biography

Early years 
Kelly was born on February 26, 1890, in The Dalles, Oregon, the third of five children of James Leo and Henrietta (née Wakefield) Kelly. He received his early education at St. Mary's Academy in The Dalles, and made his classical studies at Columbia University in Portland.

Kelly began his studies for the priesthood at St. Patrick's Seminary in Menlo Park, California, and proceeded to the Pontifical North American College and Propaganda University in Rome.

Priesthood 
Kelly was ordained a priest in Rome on June 2, 1917. He then served as a missionary in the Diocese of Baker City until 1919, when he became secretary to Bishop Joseph Francis McGrath and chancellor of the diocese.

Bishop of Boise
On December 16, 1927, Kelly was appointed the third Bishop of Boise by Pope Pius XI. He received his episcopal consecration on March 6, 1928, from Bishop McGrath, with Bishops Mathias Lenihan and Charles White serving as co-consecrators. During a visit to Vatican City in 1934, Kelly was granted a private audience with Pope Pius XI, conducted in Italian.

Death and legacy 
Edward Kelly died of a heart attack while celebrating mass in Boise on April 21, 1956; he was age 66. He was succeeded by Bishop James Byrne.Bishop Kelly High School in west Boise, opened in 1964, is named in his honor.

References

External links
Diocese of Boise – Previous Bishops

1890 births
1956 deaths
People from The Dalles, Oregon
Roman Catholic bishops of Boise
20th-century Roman Catholic bishops in the United States
University of Portland alumni
Saint Patrick's Seminary and University alumni
Catholics from Oregon